Willard Sterling Boyle,  (August 19, 1924May 7, 2011) was a Canadian physicist. He was a pioneer in the field of laser technology and co-inventor of the charge-coupled device. As director of Space Science and Exploratory Studies at Bellcomm he helped select lunar landing sites and provided support for the Apollo space program.

On October 6, 2009, it was announced that he would share the 2009 Nobel Prize in Physics for "the invention of an imaging semiconductor circuit the CCD sensor, which has become an electronic eye in almost all areas of photography".

He was appointed a Companion of the Order of Canada the award's highest level on June 30, 2010.

Early life
Born in Amherst, Nova Scotia, on August 19, 1924, Boyle was the son of a medical doctor and moved to Quebec with his father and mother Bernice when he was less than two. He was home schooled by his mother until age fourteen, when he attended Montreal's Lower Canada College to complete his secondary education.

Education 
Boyle attended McGill University, but his education was interrupted in 1943, when he joined the Royal Canadian Navy during World War II. He was loaned to the Royal Navy, where he was learning how to land Spitfires on aircraft carriers as the war ended. He gained a BSc in 1947, an MSc in 1948, and a PhD degree in 1950, all from McGill University.

Career 
After receiving his doctorate, Boyle spent one year at Canada's Radiation Lab and two years teaching physics at the Royal Military College of Canada.

Bell Labs 
In 1953 Boyle joined Bell Labs where he invented the first continuously operating ruby laser with Don Nelson in 1962, 
and was named on the first patent for a semiconductor injection laser. He was made director of Space Science and Exploratory Studies at the Bell Labs subsidiary Bellcomm in 1962, providing support for the Apollo space program and helping to select lunar landing sites. He returned to Bell Labs in 1964, working on the development of integrated circuits.

Invention of charge-coupled device 
In 1969, Boyle and George E. Smith invented the charge-coupled device (CCD), for which they have jointly received the Franklin Institute's Stuart Ballantine Medal in 1973, the 1974 IEEE Morris N. Liebmann Memorial Award, the 2006 Charles Stark Draper Prize, and the 2009 Nobel Prize in Physics. The CCD allowed NASA to send clear pictures to Earth back from space. It is also the technology that powers many digital cameras today. Smith said of their invention: "After making the first couple of imaging devices, we knew for certain that chemistry photography was dead." Eugene Gordon and Mike Tompsett, two now-retired colleagues from Bell labs, claim that its application to photography was not invented by Boyle. Boyle was Executive Director of Research for Bell Labs from 1975 until his retirement in 1979.

Personal life 
In retirement he split his time between Halifax and Wallace, Nova Scotia. In Wallace, he helped launch an art gallery with his wife, Betty, a landscape artist. He was married to Betty since 1946 and had four children, 10 grandchildren and 6 great-grandchildren.

In his later years, Boyle suffered from kidney disease, and due to complications from this disease, died in a hospital in  Nova Scotia on May 7, 2011.

Notes

External links
  including the Nobel Lecture on December 8, 2009 CCD – an Extension of Man's Vision

1924 births
2011 deaths
Canadian expatriates in the United States
Canadian inventors
Canadian Nobel laureates
Canadian physicists
Companions of the Order of Canada
Deaths from kidney disease
McGill University alumni
Nobel laureates in Physics
Draper Prize winners
People from Amherst, Nova Scotia
People from Cumberland County, Nova Scotia
Academic staff of the Royal Military College of Canada
Scientists at Bell Labs
Royal Canadian Navy personnel of World War II